Fussball-Club Luzern, or simply abbreviated to FCL, is a Swiss sports club based in Lucerne. It is best known for its professional football team, which plays in the Super League, the top tier of the Swiss football league system, and has won the national title once and the national cup three times.

The club colours are blue and white, derived from the City of Lucerne and Canton of Lucerne coats of arms. The club plays its home games at Swissporarena which was newly built in 2011 at the place of the old Stadion Allmend.

FC Luzern was founded in 1901. It has non-professional departments for women's football, volleyball, boccia and gymnastics.

History

FC Luzern's greatest success was winning the Swiss Championship in 1989. The club has also won the Swiss Cup three times (1960, 1992, 2021) and finished runners-up four times (1997, 2005, 2007, 2012).

With a total of 17 "moves", FC Luzern has the highest number of promotions and relegations to and from the national first tier since the establishment of a single nationwide top division in 1933.

The club's birth
The first known attempt to found a football club in Luzern dates back to 6 May 1867 when an announcement was published in the newspaper Luzerner Tagblatt advertising a meeting regarding the foundation of "FC Luzern" and invited "additional members". Even though the call did not have great resonance, this loose group of football friends can be described as a forerunner to FC Luzern.

In 1901, a second attempt was initiated by friends Adolf Coulin, Ernst Haag and Hans Walter, who knew football from the Romandie, where the game was already very popular. They met on 8 July 1901 with other football enthusiasts at Floragarten – a restaurant at Seidenhofstrasse near the train station – to arrange the establishment of FC Luzern. Only four days later on 12 July 1901, the first training was held at Allmend, a large green space south of the city centre that would later become the club's home. The official foundation took place on 12 August 1901.

The first match was held on 13 April 1902 away against SC Zofingen. In the 1–2 defeat, Albrik Lüthy became the first ever goal scorer for the club. The first match played on home ground was on 25 May 1902 with Zofingen as the opponent again. It ended with a 4–0 victory for the away side.

Slow start (1903–1918)
On 13 September 1903, FC Luzern became an official member of the Swiss Football Association (SFA). At the time, clubs were allowed to freely choose the division to play in and the club decided to compete in the third tier Serie C. Despite winning only one match in its first season, the club chose to start in the Serie B for the 1904–05 season. After finishing second for three consecutive years from 1906 until 1909, Luzern was incorporated into the Serie A by the SFA in 1909. However, the task proved to be too big for the side, and Luzern finished the season at the bottom of the league table.

Under new management, things turned to the better. For the first time, international matches were held, the first against Unione Sportiva Milanense in 1911, a 2–3 loss in Chiasso. In the second international encounter, Luzern drew 1–1 against Mulhouse, then won their first international match 4–2 over SV Stuttgart in 1912. After disappointing performances in the domestic league, Luzern finished bottom of the table in 1912 and 1913 and lost its right to play in the Serie A.

Luzern also struggled in Serie B and was threatened to become the second club in the city. Between 1913 and 1915, Luzern was defeated five times by city rival FC Kickers. For a time, even a merger with 1907 founded Kickers was a realistic scenario, but the merger was rejected by only one vote.

Almost champion and back to Serie B (1918–1936)
After five years in the second division Luzern returned to Serie A in 1918 after beating FC Baden. Dionys Schönecker, who joined FC Luzern from Austrian club Rapid Wien, became the first professional manager for the club in 1921. His appointment was an instant success as Luzern went on to win the central Swiss group of the Serie A and qualified for the final round of the championship. After defeating eastern Swiss champions Blue Stars Zürich 2–1, Luzern faced Servette Geneva in a title decider on 25 June 1922 in Basel. The hotly favoured and experienced Genevans won 2–0, even though the match could not be played to the end after Servette fans stormed the pitch due to a false signal by the referee. The followers could not be persuaded to leave the pitch and the Luzern side agreed to end the match to avoid further incidents.

Luzern fell back into old patterns and only narrowly escaped relegation in the two subsequent seasons, but was unable to avoid relegation in 1925. From 1925 to 1930, the club played in the second division and was often close to promotion. Within the SFA, the late 1920s and early 1930s were marked by failed attempts for league reform and chaotic association meetings. After formally securing promotion with its third consecutive second division title in 1929, Luzern was barred from participating in the national first tier until the spring of 1931. However, in 1931, a drastic reduction of clubs in the top division was implemented, meaning forced relegation for no less than 15 clubs, including Luzern.

Barren years (1936–1959)
A change in fortune saw Luzern promoted to the newly created Nationalliga in 1936. Despite sanctions by the SFA, the club managed to finish the 1936–37 season fourth, the side's best final league position until 1976. In the following years (which were heavily affected by World War II), FCL was not able to build on this success. Managers came and went but the club never ranked higher than the bottom four. When acclaimed international Sirio Vernati left Luzern in 1943, the team was deprived of its best player and was relegated in the spring of 1944.

In the 1940s, Luzern became a typical second division club. In 1952–53, Luzern again had a bad start to the campaign, but improved significantly as the season progressed. Promotion could be secured in the final match against local rival SC Zug.

The boom only lasted for two years and Luzern was relegated again in 1955. The club board appointed young German manager Rudi Gutendorf, whose managerial career would later span the entire planet. While Gutendorf saw the first years as a consolidation period, the team almost got instantly promoted after just one year in the second division. Promotion eventually came in 1958.

The first trophy and the yo-yo years (1960–1979)
While league performances in the Nationalliga A were erratic throughout the first half of the 1960s, Luzern won its first major national trophy by winning the Swiss Cup in 1960. The final was played against FC Grenchen. Luzern then participated in the first edition of the UEFA Cup Winners' Cup in 1960–61, but was comfortably defeated by Fiorentina (0–3, 2–6).

The success did not last long and the chronically poor financial situation and average league performances led to many managerial changes. The club was relegated once again in 1966, and Luzern developed a reputation as a "yo-yo team". Promotion in 1967 was followed by relegation in 1969, promotion in 1970, relegation in 1972, promotion in 1974, once again relegation in 1975 and finally promotion in 1979. Eleven different managers stood at the sideline during this time, among them the 1960 cup winner, local legend and later manager of the Switzerland national team, Paul Wolfisberg. His second managerial spell from 1978 to 1982 marked the beginning of one of the most successful periods in the club's history.

The golden years (1980–1992)
Luzern signed Ottmar Hitzfeld in the summer of 1980. (It was Hitzfeld's last station as a player before he started his successful managerial career in 1983.) With several mid-table finishes throughout the early 1980s, the club consolidated its position in the league. Friedel Rausch took over as a manager in 1985 and guided Luzern to their most successful era. In 1986, the club finished third and qualified for the UEFA Cup for the first time in club history. After a remarkable 0–0 away draw against Spartak Moscow, the home leg was lost 0–1 through a late winner for the Soviet side.

With a fifth-place finish in 1987 and 1988, Luzern, being widely viewed as an underdog team, sensationally won the Swiss championship in 1989. It is the single biggest success in the club's history to date. Luzern clinched the title race with a 1–0 home win against Servette in front of 24,000 fans. The deciding goal was scored by German striker Jürgen Mohr.

The league triumph entitled Luzern to participate in the European Cup, the club's first (and so far only) appearance in this competition. However, Luzern was without a realistic chance against Dutch champions PSV and suffered another early halt to their European campaigns. Unable to defend the league title in 1990, Luzern qualified for the UEFA Cup and secured its first European win against MTK Budapest, but lost to Admira Wacker Vienna in the next round.

In a sudden change of fortune in 1991–92, Luzern failed to qualify for the championship playoff group only due to goal difference and surprisingly suffered relegation after a hapless campaign in the relegation playoffs. Only days after the shock, Luzern won its third major trophy after beating FC Lugano 3–1 in the Swiss Cup final. Rausch left the club at the end of the season.

Decline and resurrection (1993–2006)
Having returned immediately to the Nationalliga A in 1993, the club could not live up to the earlier successes and played a mediocre role in the following years, with the exception of a cup final appearance in 1997 that was lost against champions FC Sion. The late 1990s and early 2000s were marked by frequent managerial changes and renewed financial struggles. The club's longstanding chairman, Romano Simioni (1975–1998), was forced to step down after a prolonged power struggle between different factions in the club. This was followed by a chaotic and scandal ridden period of financial and sporting instability. In 1999, the club avoided the withdrawal of its playing license only with a last-minute rescue campaign to raise funds. In 2001, Luzern's centenary year, the club's ownership entity, FC Luzern AG, entered administration.

After continuously precarious league performances, Luzern eventually got relegated in 2003. The fall went on and Luzern finished behind local rivals SC Kriens for the first time in club history in 2004. Luzern lost the Swiss Cup final in 2005 against FC Zürich. In 2006, under the management of former centre-back René van Eck, the team won the Swiss Challenge League and secured promotion with a 31-match unbeaten run.

The Super League era (2006–present)
Luzern appointed former Swiss international Ciriaco Sforza as manager and qualified for another Swiss Cup final that was lost against FC Basel in 2007. The Luzern board of directors fell out of patience with Sforza in 2008 after winning only one point in six matches. Luzern avoided relegation after appointing Rolf Fringer and eventually beating FC Lugano 5–1 on aggregate in the relegation playoffs in 2009.

The signing of star player Hakan Yakin in summer 2009 transformed the team into a successful side that finished third. The subsequent UEFA Europa League qualifiers were lost against Utrecht. After a mediocre 2010–11 season, Fringer was replaced with former Swiss international Murat Yakin, brother of Hakan Yakin. Luzern finished the 2011–12 season second – the highest finish since 1989 – but lost yet another Swiss Cup final for the fourth consecutive time. After a poor start to the 2012–13 season and the defeat to Genk in the UEFA Europa League playoff round, Murat Yakin was replaced with Carlos Bernegger. In similar fashion as his predecessor, Bernegger failed to confirm a good first season performance and was replaced by former German international Markus Babbel after a poor season start and a disappointing Europa League qualifier defeat against St Johnstone. Under Babbel's management, the club's performances stabilised as it finished fifth (2014–15), third (2015–16) and fifth again (2016–17). However, Luzern continuously failed to advance in UEFA Europa League qualifying rounds after aggregate defeats to Sassuolo in 2016 and Osijek in 2017.

After a disappointing first half of the 2017–18 season, Markus Babbel was replaced with U-21 manager Gerardo Seoane. Seoane's appointment had an immediate positive impact and the club finished the season 3rd. Only weeks after the end of the season, Seoane joined new Swiss champion Young Boys Bern in a surprise move. On 22 June 2018, FC Luzern announced the appointment of former Anderlecht and Nuremberg manager René Weiler. In early 2019, following a sequence of bad results and atmospheric tensions between Weiler and the club's sporting director Remo Meyer, Weiler was replaced by former Swiss international Thomas Häberli who lead the team to a 5th place finish. Luzern progressed to the next round in a European qualifying encounter for the first time since 1992 by beating Faroese side KÍ Klaksvik 2-0 on aggregate but was subsequently eliminated by Espanyol. After a poor first half of the 2019-20 campaign, Häberli was replaced by former Marseille and Getafe midfielder Fabio Celestini.

On 24 May 2021, Luzern won their third Swiss Cup, following a 3-1 win over FC St. Gallen.

Fans and rivalries
Although the club has only won four important national trophies, Luzern is one of the traditional football clubs in the country with a strong local supporter base. The club draws its support predominantly from Central Switzerland, leading the number of sold season tickets in the cantons of Lucerne, Obwalden, Nidwalden, Uri, Zug as well as in some parts of Aargau and Schwyz. Since moving to the new stadium in 2011, Luzern has always ranked within the top five in terms of average attendance in the Swiss Super League with an average crowd of 9,000 to 14,000.

The local derby is played with SC Kriens, whose stadium is located about 1.3 kilometres from FC Luzern's facilities at Allmend. On 12 August 2017, Luzern beat SC Kriens 1–0 in the opening round of the 2017–18 Swiss Cup. It was the first encounter between the two sides in an official contest since 2006.

Although there are no traditional and deep rooted rivalries, periods of intensified sporting competition have sparked rivalries between Luzern and Basel in the mid-1990s and with Sion in the mid-2000s. A majority of the fans, particularly Ultra groups, view FC St. Gallen as a major rival. Matches with FC Aarau are also by many considered as a local derby and attract big numbers of Luzern supporters, especially to away matches.

Stadium
Between 1934 and 2009, the club played its home games at the Stadion Allmend, which had a theoretical capacity of 25,000. For security reasons however, the Swiss Football Association did not allow more than 13,000 to attend in the final year of its existence in 2009. Until a new stadium was completed in 2011, Luzern temporarily played its home matches at the Gersag Stadion in Emmenbrücke.

In August 2011, the club moved into the newly built Swissporarena, located at the former location of the old stadium. The opening match ended with a 0–0 draw against FC Thun.

Honours
Swiss Super League
Winners: 1988–89
Runners-up: 1921-22, 2011-12
Swiss Cup
Winners: 1959–60, 1991–92, 2020–21
Runners-up: 1996–97, 2004–05, 2006–07, 2011–12

The greatest success in the club's history was winning the championship in 1989 under the management of German head coach Friedel Rausch. Furthermore, the club played in six Swiss Cup finals, winning two by defeating FC Grenchen 1–0 in 1960 and FC Lugano 3–1 (after extra time) in 1992. Later, the club lost four cup finals in a row: in 1997 against Sion (4–5 on penalties), in 2005 against Zürich (1–3), and twice against Basel, in 2007 (0–1) and 2012 (2–4 on penalties). Reaching the cup final in 2005 as a second-tier club, the promotion back to the Super League in 2006, reaching the cup finals in 2007 and 2012 and winning the cup in 2021 rank as the club's most recent successes.

All-time league table
Luzern is ranked 9th in the all-time league table.

European appearances

Source:

Recent seasons
.

The season-by-season performance of the club over the last years:

Rank = Rank in the Swiss Super League; P = Played; W = Win; D = Draw; L = Loss; F = Goals for; A = Goals against; GD = Goal difference; Pts = Points; Cup = Swiss Cup; EL = UEFA Europa League.
in = Still in competition; – = Not attended; 1R = 1st round; 2R = 2nd round; R16 = Round of sixteen; QF = Quarter-finals; SF = Semi-finals; 2Q = 2nd qualifying round; 3Q = 3rd qualifying round; PO = play-off round.
*Avoided relegation by beating FC Lugano 5 – 1 on aggregate in the relegation play-offs.

Players

Current squad

Other players under contract

Out on loan

Personnel
.

Current technical staff 

Source:

Head coaches since 2006

Head coaches until 2006

 Dionys Schönecker (1921–24)
 Franz Konya (July 1927 – 29 Dec)
 Otto Hamacek (Feb 1929 – 29 June)
 Albert Halter & Albert Mühleisen (1929)
 Karoly "Dragan" Nemes (1930 – 31 September)
 Horace Williams (October 1931–33)
 Josef Gerspach (1933–34)
 Karl Heinlein (1934 – November 35)
 Adolf Vögeli (November 1935–37)
 Josef Uridil (1937–38)
 Robert Lang (1938)
 Erwin Moser (1938–39)
 Wilhelm Szigmond (1939)
 Josef Winkler (May 1942–45)
 Gerhard Walter (Feb 1945 – May 46)
 Werner Schaer (1946–49)
 Fritz Hack (1949–51)
 Hermann Stennull (1951–55)
 Rudi Gutendorf (1955 – August 61)
 Josef Brun &  Josef Weber (September 1961–62)
 Franz Linken (April 1962–64)
 Ernst Wechselberger (1964–69)
  Juan Schwanner (1970 – October 70)
 Werner Schley &  Josef Brun (October 1970–71)
 Robert Meyer (1971 – September 71)
 Egon Milder & Josef Vogel (September 1971 – October 71)
 Josef Brun (October 1971 – November 71)
 Albert Sing (31 October 1971 – 30 June 1974)
 Ilijas Pašić (1974 – April 75)
 Paul Wolfisberg & Josef Vogel (April 1975–75)
 Otto Luttrop (1975–76)
 René Hüssy (1976)
 Albert Sing (31 December 1976 – 30 June 1978)
 Paul Wolfisberg & Josef Vogel (July 1978 – June 82)
 Milan Nikolić (1982–83)
 Bruno Rahmen (1983–85)
 Friedel Rausch (28 March 1985 – 30 June 1992)
 Bertalan Bicskei (July 1992 – December 93)
 Timo Konietzka (December 1993 – June 94)
 Jean-Paul Brigger (1 July 1994 – 10 March 1997)
 Kurt Müller (March 1997 – October 97)
 Martin Müller (November 1997 – September 98)
 Egon Coordes (27 September 1998 – 1 November 1998)
 André "Bigi" Meyer (November 1998 – December 98)
 Andy Egli (1 January 1999 – 30 June 2001)
 Ryszard Komornicki (1 July 2001 – 28 July 2001)
 Raimondo Ponte (3 August 2001 – 30 June 2002)
 Bidu Zaugg (1 July 2002 – 30 June 2003)
 Urs Schönenberger (1 July 2003 – 1 November 2003)
 René van Eck (1 July 2003 – 30 June 2006)

Source:

Owners and Leadership

Due to formal licensing requirements, the professional football operations of FC Luzern are consolidated under FC Luzern Innerschweiz AG, a company that is legally and financially separated from the club FC Luzern which retains the non-professional sections of the sports club.

FC Luzern Innerschweiz AG is ultimately owned by Bernhard Alpstaeg (52%) and Josef Bieri (48%) via their control of FCL Holding AG.

The current president is former player Stefan Wolf.

Former notable players

References

External links

 FC Luzern official website 
 FC Luzern official web tv 

 
1901 establishments in Switzerland
Association football clubs established in 1901
Football clubs in Switzerland